Ulf Hendry Sandström (born 24 April 1967 in Härnösand, Sweden) is a retired Swedish ice hockey player.

Among the clubs he played for are Bodens IK, Luleå HF and Modo Hockey. He has also appeared 47 times in the Swedish national ice hockey team, and participated in 1988 Winter Olympics, where the team took the bronze medal.

Sandström was drafted by the Chicago Blackhawks in the 5th round of the 1987 NHL Entry Draft, as 92nd overall.

A tragic bicycle accident has left Sandström paralyzed from the waist down.

Career statistics

Regular season and playoffs

International

External links 
 
 Ulf Sandström at the Swedish Olympic Committee homepage

1967 births
Swedish ice hockey players
Chicago Blackhawks draft picks
Modo Hockey players
Luleå HF players
Ice hockey players at the 1988 Winter Olympics
Olympic ice hockey players of Sweden
Olympic bronze medalists for Sweden
People from Härnösand Municipality
Living people
Olympic medalists in ice hockey
Medalists at the 1988 Winter Olympics
Sportspeople from Västernorrland County